Basil Al-Khatib is a Syrian movie and TV director, from a Palestinian origin. He was born on 6 May 1962 in Hilversum, the Netherlands. He has lived with his family in Damascus, Syria since 1963. His father is the Palestinian poet Yousif Al-Khatib.

Basil is married to Diana Gabbour, a director of the Arab Syrian TV. He was a graduate of the Department of the Film & TV Direction, The Moscow Higher Institute of Cinema (VGIK). Basil was working in cinema and television drama since 1992.

List of television series and movies as a director
 Damascus Aleppo (2018 movie)  TBR 28 FEBRUARY 2018 
 The Father
The Mother (2015 movie)
 Mariam (2013)
 Al Ghaliboun (2011-2012 TV series)
 Nasser (2008 TV series)
 Abo Zaid Al-Helaly (2005 TV series)
 Mawkib Al-Ebaa''' (2005 movie)
 Nizar Qabbani (2005 TV series)
 Returning to Haifa (2004 TV series)
 Holako (2002 TV series)
 Zy Qar (2001 TV series)
 Al-Risala Al-Akhira (2000 movie)
 Jalila'' (1993 movie)

References

External links
 
 YouTube trailer for "The Father" War Film

1962 births
Living people
Syrian television directors
Syrian people of Palestinian descent